The WDF World Darts Championship is a World Championship in darts organised by the World Darts Federation. Following the collapse of the British Darts Organisation in 2020, it essentially replaces the BDO World Darts Championship which was last held in 2020.

From 2023 onwards the tournament will be held in December each year.

Editions
 2022 WDF World Darts Championship
 2023 WDF World Darts Championship

Reflist

 
World championships in darts